Rayville or Raysville is the name of several towns in the United States:

Raysville, Georgia
Raysville, Indiana
Rayville, Louisiana
Rayville, Missouri